In mathematics, stochastic analysis on manifolds or stochastic differential geometry is the study of stochastic analysis over smooth manifolds. It is therefore a synthesis of stochastic analysis and differential geometry.

The connection between analysis and stochastic processes stems from the fundamental relation that the infinitesimal generator of a continuous strong Markov process is a second-order elliptic operator. The infinitesimal generator of Brownian motion is the Laplace operator and the transition probability density  of Brownian motion is the minimal heat kernel of the heat equation. Interpreting the paths of Brownian motion as characteristic curves of the operator, Brownian motion is can be seen as a stochastic counterpart of a flow to a second-order partial differential operator.

Stochastic analysis on manifolds investigates stochastic processes on non-linear state spaces or manifolds. Classical theory can be reformulated in a coordinate-free representation. Thus, we require an additional structure in form of a linear connection or Riemannian metric to define martingales and Brownian motion on manifolds. Therefore, controlled by the Riemannian metric, Brownian motion will be a local object by definition. However, its stochastic behaviour determines global aspects of the topology and geometry of the manifold.

Brownian motion is defined to be the diffusion process generated by the Laplace-Beltrami operator  with respect to a manifold  and can be constructed as the solution to a non-canoncial stochastic differential equation on a Riemannian manifold. As there is no Hörmander representation of the operator  if the manifold is not parallelizable, i.e. if the tangent bundle is not trivial, there is no canonical procedure to construct Brownian motion. However, this obstacle can be overcome if the manifold is equipped with a connection: We can then introduce the stochastic horizontal lift of a semimartingale and the stochastic development by the so-called Eells-Elworthy-Malliavin construction.

The latter is a generalisation of a horizontal lift of smooth curves to horizontal curves in the frame bundle, such that the anti-development and the horizontal lift are connected by a stochastic differential equation. Using this, we can consider an SDE on the orthonormal frame bundle of a Riemannian manifold, whose solution is Brownian motion, and projects down to the (base) manifold via stochastic development. A visual representation of this construction corresponds to the construction of a spherical Brownian motion by rolling without slipping the manifold along the paths (or footprints) of Brownian motion left in Euclidean space.

Stochastic differential geometry provides insight into classical analytic problems, and offers new approaches to prove results by means of probability. For example, one can apply Brownian motion to the Dirichlet problem at infinity for Cartan-Hadamard manifolds or give a probabilistic proof of the Atiyah-Singer index theorem. Stochastic differential geometry also applies in other areas of mathematics (e.g. mathematical finance). For example, we can convert classical arbitrage theory into differential-geometric language (also called geometric arbitrage theory).

Preface 
For the reader's convenience and if not stated otherwise, let  be a filtered probability space and  be a smooth manifold. The filtration satisfies the usual conditions, i.e. it is right-continuous and complete. We use the Stratonovich integral which obeys the classical chain rule (compared to Itô calculus). The main advantage for us lies in the fact that stochastic differential equations are then stable under diffeomorphisms  between manifolds, i.e. if  is a solution, then also  is a solution under transformations of the stochastic differential equation.

Notation:

  is the Stratonovich integral.
  is the one-point compactification (or Alexandroff compactification).

Stochastic differential equations on manifolds

Flow processes 
Flow processes (also called -diffusions) are the probabilistic counterpart of integral curves (flow lines) of vector fields. In contrast, a flow process is defined with respect to a second-order differential operator, and thus, generalises the notion of deterministic flows being defined with respect to a first-order operator.

Partial differential operator in Hörmander form 
Let  be a vector field, understood as a derivation by the -isomorphism

 

A partial differential operator (PDO)  is given in Hörmander form if and only there are vector fields  and  can be written in the form

 .

Flow process 

 

is a martingale, i.e.

 .

Remark 
For a test function , a PDO  in Hörmander form and a flow process  (starting in ) also holds the flow equation, but in comparison to the deterministic case only in mean

 .

and we can recover the PDO by taking the time derivative at time 0, i.e. 

 .

Lifetime and explosion time 
Let  be open und  a predictable stopping time. We call  the lifetime of a continuous semimartingale  on  if

 the stopped process  is a semimartingale.

Moreover, if  for almost all , we call  explosion time.

A flow process  can have a finite lifetime . By this we mean that  is defined such that if , then -almost surely on  we have  in the one-point compactification .

Semimartingales on a manifold 
If the semimartingale is only defined up to a finite lifetime , we can always construct a semimartingale with infinite lifetime by a transformation of time.

Stratonovich integral of a 1-form 
Let  be an -valued semimartingale and  be a 1-form. We call the integral  the Stratonovich integral of  along . For  we define .

SDEs on a manifold 
If we have identified the maximal solution, we recover directly a flow process  to the operator .

Definition 

  is a continuous semimartingale on a finite-dimensional -vector space ; and
  is a (smooth) homomorphism of vector bundles over 

 

where is a linear map.

The stochastic differential equation  is denoted by

 

or

 

If  has only finite life time, we can transform the time horizon into the infinite case.

Solutions to SDEs on a manifold 
Then  is called a solution to the SDE

 

 ,

where  is the push-forward (or differential) at the point .

If the lifetime is maximal, i.e.

 

-almost surely, we call this solution the maximal solution.

 ,

holdsup to indistinguishability.

Remark 

 .

Martingales and Brownian motion 
Brownian motion on manifolds are stochastic flow processes to the Laplace-Beltrami operator. It is possible to construct Brownian motion on Riemannian manifolds . However, to follow a canonical ansatz, we need some additional structure. The orthonormal frame bundle is the collection of all sets  of orthonormal frames of the tangent space 

 

Let  be an -valued semimartingale. The solution  of the SDE

 

In short, we get the following relations: , where

  is an -valued semimartingale; and
  is an -valued semimartingale.

For a Riemannian manifold we always use the Levi-Civita connection and the corresponding Laplace-Beltrami operator . The key observation is that there exists a lifted version of the Laplace-Beltrami operator on the orthonormal frame bundle.

 

The operator  is called Bochner's horizontal Laplace operator.

Martingales with linear connection 
To define martingales, we need a linear connection . Using the connection, we can characterise -martingales, if their anti-development is a local martingale. It is also possible to define -martingales without using the anti-development.

We write  to indicate that equality holds modulo differentials of local martingales.

Let  be an -valued semimartingale. Then  is a martingale or -martingale, if and only if for every , it holds that

Brownian motion on a Riemannian manifold 
Let  be a Riemannian manifold with Laplace-Beltrami operator . An adapted -valued process  with maximal lifetime  is called a Brownian motion, if for every 

 

is a local -martingale with life time . Note that this characterisation does not provide a canonical procedure to define Brownian motion.

References

Bibliography 
 
 
 
 
Probability theory
Pages with unreviewed translations